Amelle Chahbi (born 21 August 1980) is a French comedian, writer and director.

Biography
Of Algerian and Moroccan descent, she was born in Paris and trained at the school of the Théâtre international Béatrice Brou, with the ligue d'improvisation théâtrale de Paris and at the Marais Dance Centre. She was the opening act for performances by Jamel Debbouze and Tomer Sisley.

Chahbi appeared on the Comédie+ channel and caught the public eye when she began appearing on Canal+ as Miss Météo. She appeared regularly on Jamel Comedy Club. In 2010, she became part of the cast of the television show ; she left the show in 2012. She also appeared on the program .

She had a small role in the 2002 comedy Hypnotized and Hysterical (Hairstylist Wanted) (French title Filles perdues, cheveux gras). In 2009, she provided the voice of Chloé in the French version of the film Beverly Hills Chihuahua. She appeared in the 2009 film The Barons, the 2014 film Le Crocodile du Botswanga and the 2017 film Coexister.

In 2014, she directed her first film , based on her script for the play of the same name. The stage version had played to sold-out audiences.

Filmography

Theater

Personal life
From 2007 to 2018, Amelle is in couple with the actor and comedian Fabrice Éboué''. On 15 January 2015 she gave birth to their first child, a boy named Nael. On 1 December 2018 Fabrice Eboué announced their separation after eleven years of relationship.

References

External links 
 

1980 births
Living people
Actresses from Paris
French women dramatists and playwrights
French film directors